Kamen Ingrad Stadium is a football stadium in Velika, Croatia. It serves as home stadium for football club NK Kamen Ingrad, now NK Papuk Velika. The stadium has a capacity of 8,000 (7,095 as all-seater).

The stadium was built in several stages in the period from 1997 to 2001, coinciding with the most successful spell that the club has had, when they competed in the Croatian top level league from 2001–2007. It is owned by the construction company of the same name which built the stadium and which was the club's chief sponsor in the 2000s.

The stadium's greatest moment came when it hosted a 2003-04 UEFA Cup first round match between Kamen Ingrad and German side Schalke 04 (the result was a 0:0 draw in Velika, while the away leg in Gelsenkirchen ended 1:0 in Schalke's favour). In the Prva HNL 2006-07 season, the club was relegated from Croatia's top level league, and it continues to experience a steep decline ever since. However, the stadium hosted a few top-flight football matches in the 2008–09 season. This was due to newly promoted Croatia Sesvete's home ground, Stadion ŠRC Sesvete, being deemed unfit for first league football.

References

Kamen Ingrad
NK Kamen Ingrad
Buildings and structures completed in 2001
Buildings and structures in Požega-Slavonia County